Gusztáv Gegus (5 October 1855 - 19 February 1933) was a Hungarian politician and jurist, who served as Minister of Justice for several days in 1906.

References
 Magyar Életrajzi Lexikon

1855 births
1933 deaths
Justice ministers of Hungary